The 1985 Tirreno–Adriatico was the 20th edition of the Tirreno–Adriatico cycle race and was held from 7 March to 13 March 1985. The race started in Santa Marinella and finished in San Benedetto del Tronto. The race was won by Joop Zoetemelk of the Kwantum team.

General classification

References

1985
1985 in Italian sport
March 1985 sports events in Europe
1985 Super Prestige Pernod International